Barbara Bolt is an Australian academic and artist. She is the current director of the Victorian College of the Arts which is part of the Faculty of Fine Arts and Music at the University of Melbourne. She is a research theorist her research investigates art theory and criticism (performativity, research ethics, new materialism), art as research (practice-led research). Her art practice investigates the material possibilities of painting in a digital age and the relationship between painting and light (urban landscapes, colourfield, digital, neon).

Publications 
 Bolt, Barbara, 'Couch Grass: Ethics of the Rhizome', in: Cecilia Åsberg and Rosi Braidotti (eds.), A Feminist Companion to the Posthumanities. Springer. 2018, pp. 67-80
 Bolt, Barbara, 'Socially Engaged Art as a Boundary Rider', in: James Oliver (ed.), Associations : creative practice and research. Melbourne University Press. 2018
 Barrett, Estelle, and Barbara Bolt, eds. Material inventions: applying creative arts research. IB Tauris, 2014
 Barrett, Estelle, and Barbara Bolt, eds. Carnal knowledge: towards a'new materialism'through the arts. IB Tauris, 2013
 Barrett, Estelle, and Barbara Bolt, eds. Practice as research: Approaches to creative arts enquiry. IB Tauris, 2014
 Bolt, Barbara, Heidegger reframed: Interpreting key thinkers for the arts. IB Tauris, 2010
 Bolt, Barbara, 'The Techno-Sublime: Towards a Post-aesthetic', in: Barbara Bolt (ed.), "Sensorium: Aesthetics, Art, Life". Cambridge Scholars Press, 2007, pp. 43-51
 Bolt, Barbara, "Material thinking and the agency of matter." Studies in material thinking 1, no. 1 (2007): 1-4
 Bolt, Barbara, Art Beyond Representation: The Performative Power of the Image. London: IB Tauris, 2004

References

External links
 Official website (internet archive, 30 April 2017) 

Academic staff of the University of Melbourne
University of Melbourne women
Year of birth missing (living people)
Living people